HVS may refer to:
 Hard Very Severe, a British climbing grade
 Hartsville Regional Airport's IATA code
 Haversine,  a trigonometric function
 Heaviside step function
 Helenium virus S
 High vaginal swab
 High Voltage Software
 Hilversum railway station,  Netherlands, station code
  or Croatian Rowing Federation
 Human visual system model
 HVS Global Hospitality Services
 Hypervelocity star
 Hyperventilation syndrome